Valkyria Chronicles II is a tactical role-playing game developed and published by Sega for the PlayStation Portable. Released in 2010, it is the second game in the Valkyria Chronicles series of games and the sequel to Valkyria Chronicles.

Set two years after the onset of the Second Europan War, the game's story focuses on a military academy as its cadets seek to prevent an ethnic cleansing campaign by a ruthless rebel group. Upon release, Valkyria Chronicles II received mostly high scores from several notable video game publications.

A third game in the series, Valkyria Chronicles III, which is also on the PlayStation Portable, was released on January 27, 2011, in Japan. However, as the game takes place around the same time as the first game, it is a prequel to Valkyria Chronicles II.

Gameplay

Many gameplay concepts in Valkyria Chronicles II are carried over from the original. The BLiTZ system is used during combat scenarios, splitting the action between an overhead Command Mode and third-person Action Mode. By selecting allied units during Command Mode, using Command Points in the process, said units can move and perform actions until their Action Points run out. When the player has exhausted their available Command Points, or volunteers to pass control without using all of them, the Player Phase ends and the Enemy Phase begins. This progresses back and forth until the battle's victory conditions are achieved or the player is defeated. Valkyria Chronicles II uses a system of multiple area maps connected by enemy encampments. When an enemy camp is captured by the player's forces, subsequent areas are made available, using the camp as a way-point to call in reinforcements and proceed.

Also similar to the original, the characters available for use by the player each occupy a specific class - an exception is the main character Avan who can freely move between classes. Valkyria Chronicles II features new class types and the ability of units to change their class based on a branching tree of upgrades. All five original classes from Valkyria Chronicles reappear, some with slight modification. Scouts, Shocktroopers, Engineers, and Lancers act as the base units that lead to more powerful and specialized promotions. Snipers, rather than being a starting class, are a part of the Scout's upgrade potential. The final base class is new to the series. The Armored Tech class can disarm mines and carry large shields that can deflect rifle and machine gun fire. Armored soldiers do not carry a firearm, instead wielding a hammer to strike enemies. From these five base unit classes, individual units can use experience earned from completing missions to move into more advanced forms. Advantages garnered from upgrading class range from new weapon types to increased effectiveness against tanks to special abilities. The player has access to a tank. The tank has an increased amount of customization potential, being able to increase its firepower and armor, or be stripped down into a simple armored car.

The game's themes include school and war as the students try to juggle their responsibilities as military academy students and as soldiers. Each time a student's story is fully revealed, an optional mission featuring that character is unlocked, and clearing the mission usually replace negative traits that can hinder their progress in battle with positive ones that makes them more reliable.

Plot

The game's story takes place in 1937 E.C, two years following the conclusion of Valkyria Chronicles, in which Squad 7 defeats Maximillian in Gallia and destroys the Marmota, ending the war between Gallia and the Imperial Alliance. A rebel group of dissatisfied aristocrats and like-minded soldiers and citizens calling themselves the Gallian Revolutionary Army begins the Gallian Civil War to wage an ethnic cleansing campaign against Gallians of Darcsen descent. However, with the intense fight against the Empire having left Gallia's regular army in an exhausted state, there is initially little to stop the insurrection from gaining momentum. Laws preventing the formation of a national militia to fight fellow Gallians force the government to deploy military academy cadets to the front lines in order to combat and defeat the GRA forces.

Among the students sent out on the field is 17-year-old Avan Hardins, a young man who enrolled in Lanseal Military Academy after the death of his older brother, Leon.

Avan meets two noticeable people in particular during his entrance exam: Zeri (a Darcsen), and Cosette. Avan is elected Class Chair. The three of them are placed in Class G and start academy life. At the end of the first month, rebels attack the village of Arlem and Class G destroy their tank to stop them (thanks to Zeri's observation). The class enters the Levatain Cup, a tournament held in the school, but most of Avan's classmates are unmotivated and do not believe that they can win.

However, they win the Quarter-Final which raises their morale, but Juliana, the chair of Class A, says that they cannot win the final and they are the worst class in the school. During March, it is revealed that there are four people leading the rebels: Gilbert Gassenarl, his son Baldren, his daughter Audrey and a mysterious person known as Dirk who does not seem to be human.

Class G is ordered to escort a VIP but they are attacked by rebels and battle Dirk. A mysterious girl appears with a woman wearing a labcoat and destroys the rebel forces, helping Class G win the battle. It is revealed that the VIP is Archduchess Cordelia who is visiting villages to see the extent of the damage and help the villagers.

Class G liberates a Darcsen village which is under attack by rebel forces led by Baldren Gassenarl. He is ordered to fall back by his father. However he is suspicious about the mysterious girl and thinks that she is a new model of Artificial Valkyrur (such as Dirk). He orders Dirk to see him. Back in the Darcsen village, Zeri is affected by the killings of Darcsens and says that he will become a hero to get Gallians to accept Darcsens. Avan and Cosette meet Aliasse who says that she is a real Valkyria, and Cosette helps her plant a flower called Lion's Paw.

Yuell is attacked by rebels and Cosette seems to be affected by this: Yuell is her hometown and where her parents were murdered. Avan says that they can help the army, but Zeri tries to stop them saying that they cannot win. Avan accuses Zeri of cowardice and leaves with Cosette. Zeri changes his mind and gets the rest of Class G to help them. They defeat Audrey Gassenarl and retake Yuell.

Class G wins the Levatain finals, but their celebrations are interrupted by a rebel attack. The rebels steal research data from the old campus and fight the Lanseal forces. Class G are aided by Juliana who has turned into a Valkyria. She fights Dirk. During the fight, Dirk's helmet comes off and he is revealed to be Leon. However, he does not seem to be himself and orders the forces to retreat. Juliana is mortally wounded and dies after telling Zeri that she hoped that they could rebuild Gallia together, and giving him her bracelet as a good-luck charm. Professor Brixham, the teacher of Class G, realizes that the Headmaster was experimenting on students and that is why Leon and Juliana were turned in Valkyria. The Headmaster seems to have become crazy with grief after the research data is stolen and he commits suicide after throwing Brixham and Avan out and locking the Old Campus door.

Avan and Cosette meet Aliasse again and see that the Lion's Paw flower Aliasse planted has grown. The woman in a labcoat comes and crushes the flower, saying that any organism that is for just decorative purpose is useless. Her name is Clementia Forster. She orders Aliasse to come away with her, but Aliasse wants to stay with Avan and Cosette. Forster threatens to shoot Avan, but when he doesn't back down she leaves Aliasse, saying that Aliasse will never get a normal life. Avan and Cosette take Aliasse to Class G, and Cosette tells Aliasse that she will be like a big sister for Aliasse and will make sure that Aliasse will get a normal life. Aliasse joins Class G.

Randgriz, the capital, falls, and Gilbert Gassenarl becomes the Archduke, arresting and imprisoning Cordelia. However, his intention to make Gallia dependent on the Federation (with the cooperation of a Federation Ambassador, Jean Townshend) is opposed by Baldren. Baldren shoots Gilbert and claims the title of Archduke for himself. He orders Audrey to take a squad of V2s (artificial Valkyrur) and attack Anthold Harbour. Class G, led by Avan and Zeri, make a plan and blow up the aqueduct, causing a flood and destroying the rebel force - also killing Audrey and destroying her tank, Geriolul.

Baldren is furious when he receives the news of his sister's death. He decides to flee to the Federation for the time being and claim the throne of the Federation Council. He boards the Dandarius along with Townshend, who is now more of a hostage, and tries to flee. Avan sees them and orders Class G to battle them. He uses his bird Jarde to send a letter to Cordelia (who has regained the title of Archduchess) to mobilize the Gallian Navy and attack the Dandarius. At the harbour, Class G fights Dirk, but when they are about to lose Aliasse turns into a Valkyria, saying that Class G are her friends and she will not let Dirk hurt them. She fights Dirk and mortally wounds him. Dirk turns into his human self, Leon, again, but there is no hope for his survival. He tells Avan to forget that he had an older brother, but Avan says that he will never forget. Leon succumbs to his wounds and Aliasse apologizes, but Avan tells her that she set him free. When defeat for the rebels is near, Baldren uses the research data he has taken to turn himself into a Valkyrur. Class G defeats him and he says that they themselves stripped their nation of its defences and there is no hope for Gallia to survive now.

The Dandarius sinks and the rebels are finished. Gallia starts to rebuild itself again. However, Lanseal Academy has to be closed due to the news of experimentation on students. Class G holds a graduation ceremony, and Avan says that he will see his friends again in the future.

Development
In July 2009, Famitsu released a statement that a Valkyria Chronicles game was to be developed for the PlayStation Portable. On July 17, 2009, the official Valkyria Chronicles II website was launched to the public with the developer's blog and pictures of the game.

In a blog post on the official website, chief producer Shuntaro Tanaka has revealed that the game will keep the BLiTZ system with wireless ad hoc to be implemented. In addition, Tanaka said that the game's development for the PSP was done "to allow a broader spectrum of users to discover and enjoy what makes Valkyria special." with the possibility of the franchise returning to consoles eventually.

Due to the popularity of the PlayStation Portable in Japan, the game was specifically created with a Japanese audience in mind, resulting in a school setting and more fantastical characters compared to the first game.

The staff in the development of the game were pulled from the Valkyria Chronicles staff, mainly chief producer Shuntaro Tanaka, character designer Raita Honjo and composer Hitoshi Sakimoto with Take Ozawa being posted as the game's director with previous work done on Valkyria Chronicles as its main planner. Shinji Motoyama is the game's producer, having done production work with the Sega-made Bleach games, as well as Nightshade and Blood Will Tell. The anime cutscenes were co-produced by A-1 Pictures.

Sega revealed at the 2009 Tokyo Game Show that the popular J-Pop duo Chemistry will perform the game's opening theme, titled "Our Story".

Release
An extensive amount of special material was produced by the Valkyria Chronicles II staff as bonus items for those players who pre-order the game. First is a reel of bonus footage titled "Valkyria Chronicles 1936: Gallian Front Memoirs." Narrated by Cordelia gi Randgriz, the video summarizes the events of the first game, as well as happenings in the time gap between the two. Similarly, "Gallian Journal 1936" presents background information in the form of a news magazine, with such articles as an interview with the game's antagonist. A limited-edition game soundtrack will also be included. Those who pre-order will also have information with which to unlock Selvaria Bles as a playable character within the game.

Further hidden characters were also made available including Welkin and Alicia, Ramal Valt from the anime, and Mintz and Julius from the Valkyria Chronicles: Wish Your Smile manga. However, Welkin, Alicia, and Ramal are available as a DVD bonus from Volume 6's release in Japan while Mintz and Julius are available after using a special password. It was further announced that Isara, Maximillian, Selvaria and Faldio, also from the first game are hidden characters as well. In addition, by either a special password or linking the game with Phantasy Star Portable 2 save data, Emilia Percival can be unlocked as a playable character, though she doesn't wear the same outfit as she does in that game.  This also unlocks other content (including stickers and missions inspired by the game). Unlike its predecessor, the ability to play with Japanese voice-overs was removed in the US and EU releases.

A playable demo of the game was made available on the Japanese PlayStation Store on November 2, 2009, with an online download of the same demo following on November 5.  The demo was translated and released in the US PlayStation Store on August 10, 2010.

Reception

Valkyria Chronicles II received a positive critical reception. The game was given a total score of 35 out of 40 and a "Platinum Award" from a panel of four reviewers in the Japanese Famitsu magazine. It was the second best-selling video game in Japan during its release week at 94,000 copies sold.

IGN praised the game for its replay value in particular and listed it as the seventh best PSP game of all time. GameSpot called it 'a worthy sequel' and awarded it three emblems: 'Get More Than Your Money's Worth', 'Great Sequel' and 'Outstanding Gameplay'. Destructoid gave it a near-perfect score of 9.5, one of the highest scores on the site, and the second highest-rated PSP game after Persona 3 Portable.

Adaptations

Three manga adaptations were released by Sega in Japan.

Notes

References

External links
 Official Japanese website 
 Official North American website

2010 video games
A-1 Pictures
Enterbrain manga
Multiplayer and single-player video games
PlayStation Portable games
PlayStation Portable-only games
Sega video games
Tactical role-playing video games
Valkyria Chronicles games
Video games scored by Hitoshi Sakimoto
Video games with cel-shaded animation
Video game sequels
Video games about World War II alternate histories
Video games developed in Japan